Nathan Chamberlain (born 14 March 2000) is a Scottish rugby union player who plays for London Scottish. He previously played for Edinburgh Rugby in the United Rugby Championship. Chamberlain's primary position is fly-half.

Rugby Union career

Professional career

Chamberlain came through the Bristol Bears academy, and while studying at Hartpury College represented Hartpury University making 3 appearances, including a debut in the RFU Championship. 

He joined Edinburgh Rugby ahead of the 2020–21 Pro14 season.

Chamberlain was released by Edinburgh Rugby at the conclusion of the 2021–22 United Rugby Championship season.

He signed for London Scottish on 5 August 2022.

References

External links
itsrugby Profile

2000 births
Living people
Edinburgh Rugby players
Rugby union fly-halves
Hartpury University R.F.C. players
Scottish rugby union players
London Scottish F.C. players